Amerila nigropunctata is a moth of the subfamily Arctiinae. It was described by George Thomas Bethune-Baker in 1908. It is found in south-eastern New Guinea.

References

 , 1908: New Heterocera from British New Guinea. Novitates Zoologicae 15 (1): 175-243.

Moths described in 1908
Amerilini
Moths of New Guinea